Souk El Tenine District is a district of Béjaïa Province, Algeria.

Municipalities
The district is further divided into 3 municipalities:
Souk El-Thenine
Melbou
Tamridjet

References

Districts of Béjaïa Province